Colldejou is a municipality in the comarca of Baix Camp, in the province of Tarragona, Catalonia, Spain.

The town is located at the feet of the Mola de Colldejou, north of the Serra de Llaberia. 
The church is dedicated to Saint Lawrence.

See also
Serra de Llaberia

References

Tomàs Bonell, Jordi; Descobrir Catalunya, poble a poble, Prensa Catalana, Barcelona, 1994

External links

 Government data pages 

Municipalities in Baix Camp
Populated places in Baix Camp